KXEO (1340 AM, "AM 1340 KXEO") is a radio station broadcasting an adult contemporary music format. Licensed to Mexico, Missouri, United States, the station serves the Columbia, Missouri area. The station was first licensed February 8, 1949. The station is currently owned by KXEO Radio, Inc. and features programming from CBS News Radio. The station also broadcasts St. Louis Cardinals baseball.

References

External links

XEO
Mainstream adult contemporary radio stations in the United States
Radio stations established in 1949
1949 establishments in Missouri